Valentine is an unincorporated community in Johnson Township, LaGrange County, Indiana.

History
Valentine was laid out and platted in 1879. The Valentine post office closed in 1926.

Geography

References

Unincorporated communities in LaGrange County, Indiana
Unincorporated communities in Indiana